The Levant mole (Talpa levantis) is a species of mammal in the family Talpidae. It is found in Armenia, Azerbaijan, Georgia, Russia, and Turkey.

There are two subspecies, T. l. levantis and T. l. transcaucasica (the Transcaucasian mole); the latter is sometimes considered a distinct species, but more recent studies have refuted this. In addition, the Talysch mole (T. talyschensis) was formerly considered conspecific, but more recent studies have found it to be distinct.

References

Talpa
Taxonomy articles created by Polbot
Mammals described in 1906
Taxa named by Oldfield Thomas
Mammals of Turkey
Mammals of Azerbaijan
Mammals of Russia
Fauna of Armenia
Fauna of Georgia (country)
Mammals of the Middle East